Maurice Arthur Ponsonby Wood,  (26 August 1916 – 24 June 2007) was an Anglican bishop in the Evangelical tradition. He was a Royal Navy commando chaplain in World War II and later the Bishop of Norwich.

Early life and education
Wood was born into a teetotal Evangelical family and was educated at Monkton Combe School, Bath, Queens' College, Cambridge and Ridley Hall, Cambridge.

Family
Maurice Wood was married twice. He had three children, Andrew, Patrick and Charity with his first wife, Marjorie and three children, John, Jane and Daniel, with his second wife, Margaret.

Career
During World War II, Wood landed with his Royal Marine unit on the Normandy beaches on D-Day.  He officiated at the first service on liberated French soil, aided by the portable organ he had insisted on bringing ashore. He was awarded the Distinguished Service Cross. He was a very popular and distinguished chaplain of No. 48 (Royal Marines) Commando. He joined them after D-Day and landed with them by swimming ashore during their invasion of Walcheren island on 1 November. As in France after D-day, Wood organised a thanksgiving service at Walcheren. It may have been held in Zoutelande Church where Wood and a Dutch pastor chose hymns which could be sung in both Dutch and English.

After the war, Wood worked in the parishes of St Ebbe's, Oxford (1947–1952) and St Mary's, Islington (1952–1961) both known for their strong Evangelical traditions. He then became Principal of Oak Hill Theological College in Southgate, London. In 1971 he was appointed as the 69th Bishop of Norwich, serving in this post for 14 years before retiring in 1985. He espoused conventional Evangelical views – for example on women's ordination - and supported Mary Whitehouse in her campaigns. He was innovative – for example he bought a fleet of 36 mopeds to enable his clergy to get around their parishes – and he was a media-friendly communicator. As a supporter of Evangelism, Wood helped to organise Billy Graham's UK crusades. He was also a regular speaker at the annual Keswick Convention, serving on its council for many years. He was the first Bishop of Norwich to pay a formal visit to the Church of England's Shrine of Our Lady of Walsingham. His contradictory nature surfaced after his consecration as a bishop when he would happily wear a golden cope and was reputed to take a case of episcopal jewelled rings to functions, but he would not wear a mitre, although he occasionally permitted a mitre to be carried on a cushion before him in processions. Diocesan clergy learned of his abstinence from alcohol when only fruit juice was offered; waggishly, his crypto-Latin title as Maurice Norvic was parodied as Maurice Britvic.

Honours and awards
 14 November 1944 – Distinguished Service Cross – For gallantry, skill, determination and undaunted devotion to duty during the landing of Allied Forces on the coast of Normandy The Reverend Maurice Arthur Ponsonby Wood, Temporary Chaplain, R.N.V.R. (Bromley).

References

Sources
 EDP24 obituary, 26 June 2007
 Obituary, The Daily Telegraph, 27 June 2007
Obituary, The Independent, 28 June 2007
 Obituary, The Times, 28 June 2007
 Obituary, The Guardian, 16 July 2007

1916 births
2007 deaths
People educated at Monkton Combe School
Alumni of Queens' College, Cambridge
Bishops of Norwich
Recipients of the Distinguished Service Cross (United Kingdom)
Royal Navy chaplains
Royal Marines personnel of World War II
Royal Navy personnel of World War II
20th-century Church of England bishops
Evangelical Anglican bishops